Christopher or Chris Mann may refer to:

 Chris Mann (composer) (1949–2018), Australian-American composer and poet
 Chris Mann (poet) (born 1948), South African poet
 Chris Mann (singer) (born 1982), American singer-songwriter
 Chris Mann (footballer) (1875–1962), English footballer
 Christopher Mann (composer) (born 1965), British composer
 Christopher Mann (cricketer) (born 1981), English cricketer